Melbourne City may refer to:

Places
 Melbourne, capital city of the Australian state of Victoria
 Melbourne city centre, the central area of metropolitan Melbourne
 City of Melbourne, a local government area
 Melbourne, Arkansas, U.S.
 Melbourne, Florida, U.S.
 Melbourne, Iowa, U.S.
 Melbourne, Kentucky, U.S.

Football team
 Melbourne City FC, professional association football team that competes in the A-League
 Melbourne City FC (W-League), women's professional association football league that competes in the W-League
 Melbourne City Football Club (VFA), an Australian rules football club that played in the Victorian Football Association from 1912 to 1913

See also
Melbourne (disambiguation)